Caecum wami is a species of minute sea snail, a marine gastropod mollusk or micromollusk in the family Caecidae.

Description

Distribution
This marine species occurs off Northwestern Australia.

References

Caecidae
Gastropods described in 2009